Ferne Dean Snoyl (born 8 March 1985) is a Dutch former professional footballer who played as a left-back.

Club career
Snoyl started his professional career with Feyenoord, where he was considered a talented player but with disciplinary issues. He made his professional debut on 25 September 2003, starting in a 2–1 home win against FC Kärnten in the UEFA Cup. He was sent on loan to FC Den Bosch in the 2004–05 season to mature. He returned to Feyenoord after the season, but lost out to Pascal Bosschaart to become the starter at left-back. As a result, he was sent on a six-month loan to Scottish club Aberdeen in January 2006.

After his loan ended, Snoyl signed a three-year contract with Eredivisie club NEC on 7 July 2006, reuniting him with former Feyenoord assistant coach, Mario Been. After the first game of the 2007–08 season, Snoyl was axed from the squad by Been as he was deemed overweight. As a result, NEC hired a dietician. Snoyl regained fitness, and was eventually included in the first team again after a week. After several legal issues in October 2007, NEC announced on 7 November that Snoyl's contract had been terminated.

On 27 November 2007, Snoyl joined Eerste Divisie club RKC Waalwijk on a six-month contract, with an option for an additional year. He made his debut for the club on 11 January 2008, coming on as a substitute in the 68th minute for Savvas Exouzidis in a 7–2 league win over Go Ahead Eagles. His first start came four days later in a KNVB Cup match against HFC Haarlem, which saw RKC lose on penalties. On 29 April, the option in his contract was triggered and thus extended until 2009.

Despite a successful stint with RKC, Snoyl chose not to extend his contract with the club, and instead signed a two-year deal with NAC Breda on 13 July 2009, where he was the intended successor of Patrick Mtiliga, who had moved to Málaga. Again, he struggled with overweight and was demoted from the first team on 2 April 2010. He left the club as his contract expired in 2011. NAC supporters had tauntingly held up a banner in his final game for the club referring to his overweight and chanted "Big Mac Snoyl".

A free agent, Snoyl had a successful trial with Hungarian club Újpest in September 2011, and he signed a deal for the remainder of the 2011–12 season on 7 November. He left the club on 12 January 2012, and subsequently retired from professional football as a 27-year-old.

International career
Snoyl has been capped for various national youth teams, and participated in the 2001 UEFA European Under-16 Championship and 2002 UEFA European Under-17 Championship.

Legal issues
On 20 February 2008, Snoyl was found guilty of assaulting his then-girlfriend 18 October 2007. He was sentenced to 50 hours of community service.

On 21 February 2022, Snoyl was named as a suspect in a major case involving drug distribution and trafficking, and had been charged by the Public Prosecution Service.

Personal life
Outside of football, Snoyl is a qualified tattoo artist and owns his own tattoo studio in The Hague. Customers include Wout Weghorst, Kevin-Prince Boateng and Quincy Promes.

References

External links
 

1985 births
Living people
Dutch footballers
Netherlands youth international footballers
Dutch expatriate footballers
Feyenoord players
FC Den Bosch players
RKC Waalwijk players
NEC Nijmegen players
NAC Breda players
Aberdeen F.C. players
Újpest FC players
Eredivisie players
Eerste Divisie players
Scottish Premier League players
Expatriate footballers in Scotland
Expatriate footballers in Hungary
Dutch expatriate sportspeople in Hungary
People from Leidschendam
Association football defenders
Footballers from South Holland
Sportspeople convicted of crimes
Dutch tattoo artists